A Fleeting Moment in My Country: The Last Years of the LTTE De-Facto State is a book by Dr N. Malathy did a PhD in the University of Canterbury  in New Zealand. They spent four years from 2005 till 2009 in the then rebel LTTE administered  Vanni a de facto state. The book deals with experiences  of her work in a human rights body, a women's organization, and an orphanage. The life in the rebel held areas and brutal end to the Sri Lankan Civil War in which thousands of Tamils died.

References

2012 non-fiction books
Sri Lankan Civil War books